Parand is a planned city in the Central District of Robat Karim County, Tehran province, Iran. Its toponym means "natural silk". Owned by the Parand family. The latest census in 2016 showed a population of 97,464 people in 31,693 households.

History
The city is intended to provide residences for the staff of Imam Khomeini International Airport, and to create a balance in the settlement pattern of Tehran, establish an appropriate environment to draw in the extra population of Tehran and offer an alternative to unsystematic settlements. Parand is expected to accommodate 80,000 citizens across 1,467 hectares.

The plan was a well-planned city which responds to the community's needs. It aims to host low-income families (laborers’ and employees’ housing cooperatives) by providing low-priced residential units with bank loans thereby attracting various classes of people. In 2019, the city has not yet attained those goals.

On January 8, 2020, Ukraine International Airlines Flight 752 crashed approximately 15 kilometres north-east of the city shortly after takeoff from nearby Tehran Imam Khomeini International Airport, killing all 176 people on board. A video of a missile hitting the plane was recorded from the city.

Geography
The city of Parand is situated 10 km west from Robat Karim (situated 35 km south-west from Tehran) on the way to Saveh and it has about 13,000 students in Islamic Azad University of Parand.
The city is also accessible from Tehran Imam Khomeini International Airport via the Tehran-Qom freeway.

Parand is divided into a number of areas namely an urban texture, greenery, town services, regional services and industrial district.

References

External links
Ghost Towers – The View from Iran's Housing Crisis
ICIC.gov.ir

Robat Karim County

Cities in Tehran Province

Populated places in Tehran Province

Populated places in Robat Karim County

Planned cities in Iran